Theo Piniau (born 8 June 1993) is a Papua New Guinean track and field athlete. At the 2016 Summer Olympics he competed in the Men's 200 m.

References

External links

1993 births
Living people
Papua New Guinean male sprinters
Olympic athletes of Papua New Guinea
Athletes (track and field) at the 2016 Summer Olympics
Commonwealth Games competitors for Papua New Guinea
Athletes (track and field) at the 2014 Commonwealth Games
Athletes (track and field) at the 2018 Commonwealth Games